Yuck! The Nature and Moral Significance of Disgust is a 2011 book by Daniel Ryan Kelly in which the author provides a philosophical examination of disgust.

References

External links 
 Yuck! The Nature and Moral Significance of Disgust

2011 non-fiction books
Emotions
Ethics literature
Moral psychology books
MIT Press books